The second season of the Malayalam-language version of Indian reality television series Bigg Boss premiered on 5 January 2020. It was produced by Endemol Shine India and broadcast on Asianet. Mohanlal returned as the host. The show follows 22 contestants, who are isolated from the outside world for 105 days (or 15 weeks) in a custom built house.

The house was situated at EVP Film City in Chennai, where 17 contestants entered on Day 1 and six joined later as wildcard entries. All housemates were public figures, such as film, television, music, radio, stage and internet personalities, and models. The winner of the season will receive a flat worth ₹5 million (₹50 lakh) along with a trophy. The show aired daily at 9:00pm IST. The second season introduced an aftershow titled BB Cafe. On 20 March 2020, the show was stopped due to COVID-19.

Production
The season two of the Malayalam-language version of Bigg Boss is produced by Endemol Shine India and telecast on Asianet. In September 2019, it was confirmed that Mohanlal will return as the host for the second season as well and Asianet announced that season two would take off soon and asked viewers to suggest contestants to be featured on the show through their social media pages. The season two comes with the tagline: Ini Valiya Kalikalumalla, Kalikal Vere Level (it's no longer just big games, now the games will go on its next level). The newly designed eye logo was unveiled in November 2019, first promo for the show was also released on that month.

House
The House for the first season of Bigg Boss was built at Goregaon Film City, Mumbai. Since season 13 of Hindi Bigg Boss was ongoing at the location, the location has to be shifted to EVP Film City, Chennai, where the first three seasons of Bigg Boss Tamil was filmed. The 6000 square feet House was redesigned in the traditional architectural style of Kerala. Along with all the facilities that was available in the first season, the major new addition was a jail room with attached toilet for incarcerating housemates who violate the rules of the House. The essential facilities retained from the first season was dining area, living area, store room, kitchen, two bedrooms with eight beds, washroom, TV, swimming pool, confession room for interacting with Bigg Boss (voice), and smoke room for smokers.

Broadcast
The second season is telecast on Asianet, initially from Monday to Friday at 9:30pm IST and at 9:00pm IST on Saturdays and Sundays. From 9 March 2020 onward, duration was extended and airing time changed to 9:00pm on weekdays too. Asianet also airs an aftershow BB Cafe hosted by Rajesh Keshav and Gopika. The show is available for streaming on the over-the-top platform Hotstar. It is aired in two parts—Bigg Boss and Bigg Boss Plus. Hotstar may or may not contain few bits aired on television at the original airing time. Additionally, the YouTube channel of Asianet also uploads short "UnCut" clips not broadcast on television and Hotstar. The 30-minute BB Cafe Live regularly reads live comments on YouTube and Facebook about each day's episodes.

Housemates status

Housemates
The participants in the order of appearance and entrance in the house are:

Original entrants
 Rajini Chandy, Film Actress
 Alina Padikkal, TV Host, TV Actress
 Raghu Subhash, Radio Jockey
 Arya Badai, TV Host
 Pashanam Shaji, Film Actor
 Veena Nair, Film & TV Actress
 Manju Pathrose, TV Actress
 Pareekutty Perumbavoor, tiktok, Internet Celebrity
 Thesni Khan, Film Actress
 Rajith Kumar, Social Activist
 Pradeep Chandran, Film & TV Actor
 Fukru (Krishna Jeev), Internet Celebrity
 Reshma Rajan, Model
 Somadas Haridasan, Singer
 Alasandra Johnson, Model
 Sujo Mathew, Model
 Suresh Krishnan, Director

Wild card entrants
 Daya Ashwathy, Social Activist, Internet Celebrity
 Jazla Madasseri, Social Activist
 Sooraj V V, Radio Jockey
 Pavan Gino Thomas, Model
 Abhirami Suresh, Singer, Actress
 Amrutha Suresh, Singer

Guests

Episodes

Nominations table

  indicates the house captain.
  indicates that the Housemate was directly nominated for eviction.
  indicates that the Housemate was immune prior to nominations.
  indicates the contestant has been evicted.
  indicates the contestant walked out  to emergency.

Notes

 : On Day 15, Somadas walked-off the house due to his poor health conditions.
 : 5 housemates (including a nominated contestant) were hospitalized due to a viral infection, they were given a chance to get cured and move onto next week and so there was no eviction.
 : Due to illness and being hospitalized, Alassandra, Raghu, Pavan and Sujo were exempted from the nomination procedures.
 : After getting nominated on week 6, Jasla used her immunity power to save herself from the nomination.
 : On Day 40, Pavan had very poor health condition and decided to walk-off the house for his further treatment.
 : On Day 46, The housemates nominated Jasla and Sooraj for having weak characters in the house as part of the daily task. Both of them had 3 votes each and they were told to discuss so that one of them will be directly nominated to the Week 8 evictions. At the end, Sooraj stood himself to get nominated.
 : On Day 49, Alassandra, Raghu and Sujo re-entered the house along with two new wild card entries.
 : On Day 55, Alina, Daya and Reshma re-entered the house.
 : After getting nominated on week 9, Arya and Raghu used her immunity power to save herself from the nomination.
 : On Day 65, Bigg Boss temporarily ejected Rajith for violating the rules of the house after physically harming a lady contestant during a task. Later on Day 70, Rajith got ejected permanently after being rejected by Reshma to re-enter in the Bigg Boss house.

Voting Trend table
 Week 2 Rajini Evicted with 6.87% of votes while Rejith, Alina and Soju were in top 3 with 48%,18%,12% of votes and Alasandra was at top 4th with 11.9% of votes Somadas was in top 5 with 8% of vote
 Week 3 Rejith, veena and Alina was in top 3 with 41%,19.1%,12% of vote share while Alasandra,Theshni Khan and Reshma were in top 6 with 8%,6.8%,6.3% of votes.pareekutty and suresh was evicted with 5.9%,4% of votes
 Week 4 Rejith,Arya and Veena was in top 3 with 56%,18%,10.9% of votes and Reju,pradeep also was safe from elimination with 6%,4.1% of votes Theshni Khan was evicted from the show with 4% of votes.
 Week 5 Daya was in top 1 with highest voting Ever almost 68% of votes and Veena and pradeep was at 2nd and 3rd with 9.6%,7% of votes Jazla and Reshma was in danger zone with 4.7%,3% of votes.
 Week 6 Rejith ,Daya and Aryawas in top 3 with 40%,23%,18% of votes while veena,Sooraj and manju also was in safe zone with 8%,3.9%,2.6% of votes and finally pradeep was evicted with 1.8% of votes
 Week 7 Rejith,Fukru and Arya was in safe zone with 60%,20%,10% of votes while veena got almost 7% of votes Jazla was safe with 1.9% of votes manju was evicted with 1.1% of votes
 Week 8 Rejith got 46% of votes while Arya and Fukru got 23% and 21% of votes while veena got 6% of votes Jazla and sooraj got evicted with 2.1% and 2% of votes
 Week 9 AG sisters got 60% of votes while Soju, Alasandra and saju got 12%,10%,10% of votes and one of the strongest female contestant Veena Nair got evicted with almost 10%(9.6%) of votes.
 Week 10 Ag sisters are safe with 30% of votes Saju,Daya was also safe with 28% and 26% of votes while reghu and Reshma was in danger zone with 10% of votes but Reshma(9.93) got evicted she got a little bit votes lesser than reghu(9.98%).
 Week 11 Ag sisters,Arya and soju were in top 3 with 32%,23%,20% of votes Saju, Alasandra and Daya was also in safe zone with 13%,10%,9.8%  of votes Alina and reghu was in danger zone with almost 7% of votes but the show disconnected so no eviction took place
 Show ended all housemates were evicted due to corona pandemic situation.

Cancellation
On 17 March 2020, Endemol Shine India announced that they are voluntarily suspending all their administrative and production departments until further notice due to the global COVID-19 pandemic, for minimizing the spread and to comply with the safety and precautionary measures suggested by the government. It is also in the wake of decision by Federation of Western India Cine Employees (FWICE) and Indian Film & Television Directors' Association (IFTDA) to hold shootings of film, TV shows and web series from 19 March to 31 March 2020. As of 2020, this was the fourth season overall in the Big Brother franchise to have a season discontinued without a winner, following Arab world's Big Brother: The Boss, Serbia's second season of Veliki Brat, and Canada's eighth Big Brother; while the latter also ceasing production for the same reason due to the pandemic, the first two were not caused by the pandemic (Arab world was due to a religious controversy, and Serbia was due to the deaths of the HouseGuests during an official event).

Ratings and viewership
Official ratings are taken from BARC India.

References

External links
 
 

Television productions cancelled due to the COVID-19 pandemic
Asianet (TV channel) original programming
Malayalam-language television shows